Andrea Tessiore (born 1 October 1999) is an Italian footballer who plays as a midfielder for  club Triestina.

Career

Sampdoria 
Born in Pietra Ligure, Tessiore was a youth exponent of Sampdoria.

Loan to Vis Pesaro 
On 23 July 2018, Tessiore was signed by Serie C club Vis Pesaro on a season-long loan deal. On 18 September he made his professional debut, in Serie C, as a starter in a 2–0 away defeat against Triestina, he was replaced by Flavio Lazzari after 61 minutes. Eleven days later, on 26 September, he scored his first professional goal, as a substitute, in the 86th minute of a 1–1 away draw against Sambenedettese. On 5 May 2019, Tessiore played his first entire match for the club, a 3–3 away draw against Giana Erminio. Tessiore ended his season-long loan to Vis Pesaro with 25 appearances, 1 goal and 1 assist.

On 16 July 2019, Tessiore returned to Vis Pesaro on another season-long loan. On 25 August he made his season debut for Vis Pesaro in a 2–1 home defeat against Südtirol, he played the entire match. Tessiore ended his second season to Vis Pesaro with 17 appearances, including 12 as a starter, and 2 assist.

On 28 August 2020 the loan has been extended.

Latina
On 11 August 2021 Tessiore signed for Latina on a free transfer.

Triestina
On 31 January 2023, Tessiore moved to Triestina.

Career statistics

Club

References

External links 
 

1999 births
Living people
Sportspeople from the Province of Savona
Footballers from Liguria
Italian footballers
Association football midfielders
Serie C players
U.C. Sampdoria players
Vis Pesaro dal 1898 players
Latina Calcio 1932 players
U.S. Triestina Calcio 1918 players